Wang Xiaodong (born 3 January 1960) is a Chinese politician and current Deputy Party Committee Secretary and Governor of Hubei province. Originally from Jiangxi province, Wang spent his early career in his home province and in Guizhou. He was transferred to Hubei in 2011.

Biography 
Wang was born in Xinfeng County, Jiangxi province. Wang joined the Communist Party of China in January 1983. He graduated from Jiangxi University with a degree in Marxist philosophy. He began his career in rural work in Jiangxi province, then worked as a party functionary in the General Office of the Jiangxi party committee, the Jiangxi social and education commission, the provincial policy research office, and the director of the Guizhou party general office. He became a member of the Guizhou party standing committee in December 2000 while party secretary of Guiyang, then in May 2007 became executive deputy governor of Guizhou.

In December 2011 he became a member of the Hubei party standing committee, then named executive deputy governor of Hubei. In April 2016 he was named deputy party secretary of Hubei. After serving for over 16 years in a deputy provincial-ministerial position, Wang was elevated to acting governor of Hubei in September 2016.

As the deputy secretary and governor of Hubei Province, Wang has been involved in mitigating the COVID-19 pandemic.

On 23 June 2021, he was transferred to Beijing and appointed deputy director of the Agricultural and Rural Committee of the National Committee of the Chinese People's Political Consultative Conference.

References

External links

王晓东同志简历 on ce.cn 10 May 2014

1960 births
Living people
Chinese Communist Party politicians from Jiangxi
Politicians from Ganzhou
People's Republic of China politicians from Jiangxi
Political office-holders in Guizhou
Governors of Hubei
Members of the 19th Central Committee of the Chinese Communist Party